Satilla may refer to:

The Satilla River in Georgia in the United States
The Little Satilla River in Georgia in the United States, one of two rivers with this name:
The Little Satilla River (Satilla River), a tributary of the Satilla River
The Little Satilla River (Atlantic Ocean), not a tributary of the Satilla River 
Big Satilla Creek, a tributary of the Little Satilla River (Satilla River tributary)
Little Satilla Creek, a tributary of the Little Satilla River (Satilla River tributary)
, a United States Navy patrol vessel in commission from 1917 to 1919